Phyllodromia fusca is a species of dance flies, in the fly family Empididae.

References

Empididae
Insects described in 1914
Taxa named by Mario Bezzi
Diptera of Asia